Nonesuch is an unincorporated community in Woodford County, Kentucky, United States. The etymology of the area referred to its ability to maintain great crops for agriculture. Specifically, there was no such place that grew so well.

References

Unincorporated communities in Woodford County, Kentucky
Unincorporated communities in Kentucky